= Bringing Assad to Justice =

- Directed by: Ronan Tynan
- Produced by: Ronan Tynan; Anne Daly
- Edited by: Kevin Cooney
- Production company: Ezperanza Productions
- Release date: 2021
- Running time: 110
- Country: Ireland
- Language: English

Bringing Assad to Justice is a 2021 Irish documentary film about bringing the Syrian President Bashar al-Assad to justice for war crimes and crimes against humanity during the Syrian Civil War. It is produced by Anne Daly and Ronan Tynan.
